Comic Con may refer to:

 Comic-Con (with hyphen), a registered trademark owned by San Diego Comic-Con International
 Comic Con, a list of comic-book conventions around the world
 Comic book convention (or comic-con), a meeting of comic-book fans, creators, and publishers

See also
 Comecon (band), a Swedish death-metal band